Here and Now is the second studio album by Canadian country music group The Wilkinsons, released on April 4, 2000. The album includes three singles, all three of which charted in Canada.

Content
In Canada, the singles "Jimmy's Got a Girlfriend", "Shame on Me", and "1999" respectively peaked at numbers 11, 10, and 16 on the RPM country singles charts. In the United States, the former two singles respectively reached numbers 34 and 49 on Hot Country Songs, while "1999" did not chart.

Critical reception

Maria Konicki Dinoia of Allmusic rated the album 3.5 out of 5 stars, saying that "Amanda's vocals, Tyler's harmonies, and Steve's writing all contribute to one of the finest sophomore outings by a country group in a long time." Robert Loy of Country Standard Time was less favorable, criticizing the album for being "skewed toward the young country-pop crowd" and having songs that "have very little to say to anyone whose acne has already cleared up".

Track listing

Personnel

The Wilkinsons
 Amanda Wilkinson - vocals
 Steve Wilkinson - vocals
 Tyler Wilkinson - vocals

Additional Musicians
 David Angell - violin
 John Catchings - cello
 Joe Chemay - bass guitar
 Eric Darken - percussion
 David Davidson - violin
 Shannon Forrest - drums
 Paul Franklin - steel guitar, pedabro
 Sonny Garrish - steel guitar, Dobro
 Steve Gibson - acoustic guitar, electric guitar, mandolin
 John Hobbs - synthesizer guitar, piano, string arrangements, conductor
 Brent Rowan - electric guitar, gut string guitar
 Steve Wariner - background vocals on "The Only Rose"
 Biff Watson - bouzouki, acoustic guitar
 Kris Wilkinson - viola, string arrangements

Chart performance

References

The Wilkinsons albums
2000 albums
Giant Records (Warner) albums
Albums produced by Doug Johnson (record producer)
Canadian Country Music Association Album of the Year albums